Bolgare is a comune in the province of Bergamo, in Lombardy, Italy. It is situated in the plain between the rivers Serio and Oglio, 13 km southeast of Bergamo.

Bounding communes

Gorlago
Carobbio degli Angeli
Chiuduno
Telgate
Grumello del Monte
Palosco
Calcinate
Costa di Mezzate

References

External links
eng/comuni/bg/bolgare/bolgare.html Town of Bolgare
Coat of Arms of Bolgare